Steinheim is a town in the commune of Rosport, in eastern Luxembourg.  , the town has a population of 532.

Rosport
Towns in Luxembourg